DMW Motorcycles was a British motorcycle manufacturer. Based in Wolverhampton, DMW was founded in 1940.  The company took over Ambassador Motorcycles in 1963 and continued production until they closed the company in 1965. Although DMW ceased motorcycle production in 1971, it was noted for trials and racing machines and many DMWs can still be seen at UK sporting events. DMW produced about 15,000 motorcycles and several other manufacturers used DMW forks and engines.

History
Founded by Leslie "Smokey" Dawson who was granted British patents on rear swinging arm suspension, dual brakes and tele -matic front forks.  As Dawson Motors Wolverhampton in 1940, DMW fabricated and fitted  new swing arm kits to existing machines.  Dawson's Telematic -forks, which were telescopic spring and pneumatic front forks that could be'retro-fitted' as a replacement to standard 'girder' forks. In 1943 Dawson added rear suspension options which he would fit in his Wolverhampton workshop. After the Second World War ended in 1945 Smokey Dawson began building D.M.W. grass track racing motorcycles  machines with 350 cc and 500 cc JAP engines.  Dawson went into partnership with former AJS and Vincent man Harold Nock to build light two-stroke motorcycles. Leslie Dawson was unsuccessful in raising venture capital and emigrated to Canada in 1948.  Leslie died in Ellesmere Port on 6 January 1989.

Leslie was replaced by former BSA engineer Mike Riley, who won the 1948 Scottish Trial on a 200 cc DMW. Production moved to Harold Nock's premises in Sedgley and a 122 cc DMW with a Villiers engine was launched in 1950. These were entered in and won numerous competitions and DMW exhibited at the Earls Court Motor Cycle Show in 1952 with three road motorcycles and three racing bikes. Production then switched to a larger factory in nearby Sedgley, the base of Metal Profiles Ltd.

A range of relatively successful two-stroke models were produced throughout the 1960s, notably the DMW  Dolomite.  DMW production ended in 1971 and Harold Nock sold the company in 1975 to Graham Beddall and Ivan Dyke, who concentrated on engineering and selling parts, although they did build one-off competition motorcycles, and a DMW 250 cc won the Midland Centre Group Trials in 1976 and 1977. Beddall and Dyke retained ownership of the DMW name until 2001, when it was wound up.

The Sedgley factory remained in use until the mid 1990s, and stood derelict for several years before it was finally demolished in the summer of 2002 to make way for new private housing.

Models

References

External links
 Gallery and review of DMV models
 DMW Sales Catalogues
 The 'Sedgeley Motorcycle Company' (DMW)

Motorcycle manufacturers of the United Kingdom
Defunct motor vehicle manufacturers of England
Manufacturing companies based in Wolverhampton